Ousefleet is a small hamlet in the East Riding of Yorkshire, England approximately  east of Goole. It is located just south of the River Ouse and north of the A161 road between Goole and Scunthorpe. It forms part of the civil parish of Twin Rivers.

Overview

Ousefleet was previously a civil parish that was part of the Goole Rural District in the West Riding of Yorkshire from 1894 to 1974, then in Boothferry district of Humberside until 1996.

Ousefleet is listed by Ordnance Survey as being near to the grid square (on 1:50000 and 1:25000 maps) that has the least detail (a pylon line).

Ousefleet has a village hall that was a former school of Victorian origin with some extensions added during the 20th century.  The Hall Management Committee are raising funds to carry out improvements.

Ousefleet holds a village show, generally in August.  The show was revived in 1965.

References

Villages in the East Riding of Yorkshire